Théodore Jacques Ralli or Theodorus Rallis (full name: Theodoros Rallis-Scaramanga; ; Constantinople, 16 February 1852 – 2 October 1909, Lausanne) was a Greek painter, watercolourist and draughtsman, who spent most of his working life in France and Egypt.

He painted genre works, portraits, local figures, architectural subjects, interiors with figures and animals. But he is best known for his orientalist paintings.

Biography 

He was sent to Paris under the patronage of King Otto of Greece  and studied under Jean-Léon Gérôme, French painter and professor at the École des Beaux-Arts, and under Jean-Jules-Antoine Lecomte du Nouy, both known for their orientalist paintings.

Ralli then travelled widely in North Africa and the Middle East, settling for a while in Cairo, Egypt. Here he found his inspiration for the romantic mysticism and suggestive sensuality of his many orientalistic paintings. His other genre paintings were often nostalgic recollections of the life and customs of his Greek homeland, which he portrayed with a delicate and moving reverence. His paintings were elaborated with great attention to detail, with great attention to costumes and facial expressions. The varying light sources in his paintings such as rays of light, candles, or the glowing embers in the fireplace are rendered in soft colours.

Rallis first exhibition was at the Salon in 1875. From 1879 he regularly exhibited at the Royal Academy in London. He was a member of the Société des Artistes Français, where he received an honourable mention in 1885, and a silver medal in 1889  for his whole work He exhibited his paintings in the Salon de Rouen (1897, 1903, 1906 and 1909) and also in Athens during the Olympic Games of 1896. He also served as a member of the competition jury in 1900 at the Exposition Universelle. In 1901 he became a chevalier of the Légion d’Honneur.

After his death he was slowly almost forgotten. It is telling that his name is not even included in the Grove Dictionary of Art. Most of his paintings are still in private collections and only a few museums have ever purchased his works. A few of his paintings were auctioned in the 20th century, but only obtained modest prices. However in the 21st century, his paintings have been rediscovered and are being auctioned at prices that are a tenfold of some years before, fetching prices from 30,000 to 100,000 euros. On 14 November 2007 a study for the painting Refectory in a Greek Monastery (Mount Athos) (1885) was auctioned at 200,000 euros at Sotheby's in London, and in January 2008, the painting itself was sold at the absolute record price of 670,000 euros to a Greek collector at an auction in Ghent, Belgium. This was followed by the sale of his oil on canvas, titled Praying Before the Communion at Megara (1890), by Bonhams in London on 25 May 2008, achieving a staggering hammer price of £600,000.

Museums 
 Greek National Gallery, Athens (two paintings)
Louvre, Paris (one painting)
Sydney (one painting)

Selected works 
Praying in a Greek church, Mount Parnassus 1876
Boa Charmer in the Harem (1882) (oil on canvas)
Snake Charmer in the Harem (1882) (oil on canvas)
Wake of the Pasha of Tangier (1884) (oil on canvas)
Refectory in a monastery (Mount Athos) (1885) (oil on canvas)
Reclining Odalisk (1885) (oil on canvas)
Sleeping Concubine (1885) (oil on canvas)
La Demoiselle (1887) (oil on canvas)
Evening Prayers (1890) (oil on canvas)
Praying before the Communion, Megara (1890) (oil on canvas) (presented at the Salon of 1890)
In the mosque, 1891
Seamstress (1895) (oil on canvas)
Drama in the Harem (1908) (oil on canvas) (presented at the Salon of 1908)
Jerusalem
Before Solomon’s Wall in Jerusalem
Woman in Arab Interior
Girls in Orthodox Church
Benediction (oil on canvas)
Peasant Woman resting (watercolour and pencil)
Girl in Church, Candle in Hand (oil on canvas)
Two camels in the Desert (watercolour heightened with gouache)
Ah ! Jealous Woman among Jealous Women (oil on canvas)
The Sultan’s Favourite
The Offering
The Bath  (oil on canvas)
Young Beauty (oil on canvas)
A Greek Beauty (watercolour on paper)
Portrait of a Greek Girl (Helen of Megara) (oil on panel)
Two Wise Old Men in Turbans (watercolour)
Portrait of a Man in Green (oil on canvas on card)
Sleeping in Church (oil on canvas)
Entrance to Mary’s Tomb in Jerusalem (watercolour)
Religious Instruction in an Algerian Mosque (oil on canvas)
Girl Spinning Wool (oil on panel)
Portrait of the Artist

See also

List of Orientalist artists
Orientalism

Notes

References 
Benezit, E., Dictionnaire des Peintres, Sculpteurs, Dessinateurs et Graveurs - Librairie Gründ, Paris, 1976;  (in French)

External links 
 

Greek painters
19th-century French painters
French male painters
20th-century French painters
20th-century French male artists
1852 births
1909 deaths
Emigrants from the Ottoman Empire to France
Chevaliers of the Légion d'honneur
Orientalist painters
Constantinopolitan Greeks
Artists from Istanbul
19th-century Greek painters
20th-century Greek painters
19th-century French male artists